Conospermum incurvum, commonly known as plume smokebush, is a shrub endemic to Western Australia.

Description
It grows as a prostrate little-branched shrub, the stems densely covered in slender, pointed leaves from seven to 30 millimetres long, and 0.5 to 0.8 millimetres wide. Although prostrate, it has erect flower stalks that give it a height of up to a metre. Inflorescence with numerous clusters of tubular, wooly, white flowers, 6mm long, in winter to spring and occur in elongated panicles. Compounds from this plant are currently being investigated for medicinal use.

Taxonomy
It was first published in John Lindley's 1839 A Sketch of the Vegetation of the Swan River Colony, based on unspecified material. Its taxonomic history since that time has been entirely without incident, with neither synonyms nor infrageneric taxa being published. In 1995, Eleanor Bennett published a treatment of Conospermum for the Flora of Australia series of monographs, placing C. incurvum in Conospermum subg. Conospermum, sect. Eriostachya, subsect. Multibracteata. It is the type species of the subsection. Its closely relative is C. brachyphyllum, from which it may be distinguished by its more densely clustered leaves.

Distribution and habitat
It occurs in undulating sandplains of white, grey or yellow/brown sand over laterite, ranging from Eneabba south to Perth. Thus it primarily occurs in the Swan Coastal Plain and Geraldton Sandplains biogeographic regions. There are also some outlying populations in the Avon Wheatbelt and Jarrah Forest regions, and a single population in the Esperance Plains region north of Albany.

Ecology
It is not considered threatened.

References

External links

Eudicots of Western Australia
incurvum